Into the Night is the second album by horror punk band Son of Sam. It was released on September 16, 2008.

Track listing
 "The Bleeding" - 4:19
 "Suffer" - 3:20
 "Dark Life" - 3:15
 "Into The Night" - 3:18
 "Twisted Soul" - 4:00
 "Death Baby" - 4:32
 "They Have Risen" - 1:38
 "Sons Of New" - 3:46
 "Darkness Calls (Pure Evil II)" - 4:38

Personnel
Ian Thorne - Vocals
Steve Zing - Bass
Todd Youth - Guitar
Karl Rosqvist - Drums

2008 albums
Son of Sam (band) albums
Caroline Records albums